Eucamptognathus boucardi is a species of ground beetle in the subfamily Pterostichinae. It was described by Tschitscherine in 1890.

References

Eucamptognathus
Beetles described in 1890